Jonathan Thomas "Jon" Robinson (born January 18, 1976) is an American football executive who most recently served as the general manager and executive vice president of the Tennessee Titans of the National Football League (NFL).

College career
After high school, Robinson played football at the United States Air Force Academy for one season, before transferring to Southeast Missouri State University after one semester, where he played three seasons as a defensive lineman. He graduated from Southeast Missouri State in 1998 and joined his alma mater as a graduate assistant for one season. In 1999, he joined Nicholls State University as a graduate assistant for two seasons, and then served as their linebackers coach in 2001.

Professional career

New England Patriots
He became an area scout for the New England Patriots in 2002, a position he held until 2006, when he was promoted to a regional scout. In 2008, he was promoted to the Patriots' assistant director of college scouting. In 2009, he was promoted to the position of Director of College Scouting for the New England Patriots, a position that he held until 2013.

Tampa Bay Buccaneers
In 2013, Robinson took the position of Director of Player Personnel for the Tampa Bay Buccaneers.

Tennessee Titans
On January 14, 2016, Robinson was hired as the general manager of the Tennessee Titans. He improved on the Titans 2015 record, an abysmal 3-13, to 9-7 in 2016. They barely missed the playoffs after a Week 16 loss to the Jacksonville Jaguars. On January 5, 2017, Robinson, while retaining his general manager position, was promoted to executive vice president. In 2017, the Titans once again went 9-7, but made the playoffs for the first time since 2008. They beat the Kansas City Chiefs in the Wild Card, but fell to the New England Patriots in the Divisional Round. In 2018, the Titans went 9-7 again, but missed the playoffs in a Week 17 loss to the Indianapolis Colts. Robinson is the only general manager in the Titans era to have three, and now five, consecutive winning seasons. The Titans made the playoffs in 2019, with a 9–7 record for the fourth season in a row. After beating the Patriots in the Wild Card round and blowing out the heavily-favored Baltimore Ravens in the Divisional Round, the Titans lost to the Kansas City Chiefs 35-24 in the AFC Championship.

During his tenure as general manager, Robinson has drafted 29 players, two of which, running back Derrick Henry and safety Kevin Byard, have made Pro Bowls. Since then, three of Robinson’s free agent/trade acquisitions have also made Pro Bowls, those being running back DeMarco Murray, safety Brynden Trawick for special teams, and quarterback Ryan Tannehill; Robinson has also traded for several All-Pro players such as Julio Jones and Desmond King.

Robinson is generally viewed very favorably by Titans fans for his successful tenure with the team. He is commonly referred to as JRob by Titans fans.

On December 6, 2022, despite a 7–5 record during the 2022 season, Robinson was fired by the team.

Notes and references

External links
Nicholls State bio

1976 births
Living people
People from Union City, Tennessee
American football defensive linemen
Air Force Falcons football players
New England Patriots coaches
New England Patriots scouts
Tennessee Titans executives
Nicholls Colonels football coaches
Southeast Missouri State Redhawks football players
Southeast Missouri State Redhawks football coaches